Generally, Tri Nations refers to a sports competition between three national representative teams.

3 Nations, Tri Nations, or variation, may refer to:

Sports

Rugby
In rugby union
 Tri Nations (rugby union), between Australia, New Zealand and South Africa (superseded by The Rugby Championship)
 Pacific Tri-Nations, between Fiji, Samoa and Tonga
 North African Tri Nations, between Morocco, Algeria and Tunisia

In rugby league
 Rugby League Tri-Nations, between Australia, New Zealand and Great Britain
 Central Europe Development Tri-nations, between Germany, Austria and Estonia

Other sports
 Three Nations Senior Lacrosse League
 Beach Cricket Tri-Nations series
 Tri Nations (association football)
 3 Nations Cup in women's ice hockey

Other uses
 Republic of Three Nations, a proposed country composed of Poland, Lithuania and Ruthenia
 Union of Three Nations, an upper classes pact against the peasantry in Transylvania
 Three Nations Crossing, a bridge in Canada, Akwesasne, USA
 Three-Nations Research Institute, a Japanese research company

See also

 Three Kingdoms (disambiguation)
 Four Nations (disambiguation)